Ferdinando De Giorgi (born 10 October 1961) is an Italian professional volleyball coach and former player, a participant at the Olympic Games Seoul 1988, three–time World Champion (1990, 1994, 1998), and the 1989 European Champion. He currently serves as head coach for the Italy national team. He is the second person in the world to have won World Championship both as a player and as a coach.

Career as coach
In March 2015, he signed a contract with Polish club ZAKSA Kędzierzyn-Koźle. On 20 December 2016, he was named a new head coach of the Polish national volleyball team. He replaced previous head coach Stéphane Antiga.

Honours

As a player
 CEV Cup
  1996/1997 – with Alpitur Traco Cuneo
 CEV Challenge Cup
  1995/1996 – with Alpitur Cuneo
  2001/2002 – with Noicom Cuneo

 National championships
 1986/1987  Italian Championship, with Panini Modena
 1995/1996  Italian Cup, with Alpitur Traco Cuneo
 1996/1997  Italian SuperCup, with Alpitur Traco Cuneo
 2001/2002  Italian Cup, with Noicom Brebanca Cuneo

As a coach
 CEV Champions League
  2018/2019 – with Cucine Lube Civitanova

 FIVB Club World Championship
  Betim 2019 – with Cucine Lube Civitanova

 CEV Challenge Cup
  2001/2002 – with Noicom Cuneo
  2005/2006 – with Lube Macerata

 National championships
 2001/2002  Italian Cup, with Noicom Brebanca Cuneo
 2002/2003  Italian SuperCup, with Noicom Brebanca Cuneo
 2005/2006  Italian Championship, with Lube Banca Marche Macerata
 2006/2007  Italian SuperCup, with Lube Banca Marche Macerata
 2007/2008  Italian Cup, with Lube Banca Marche Macerata
 2008/2009  Italian SuperCup, with Lube Banca Marche Macerata
 2008/2009  Italian Cup, with Lube Banca Marche Macerata
 2015/2016  Polish Championship, with ZAKSA Kędzierzyn-Koźle
 2016/2017  Polish Cup, with ZAKSA Kędzierzyn-Koźle
 2016/2017  Polish Championship, with ZAKSA Kędzierzyn-Koźle
 2018/2019  Italian Championship, with Cucine Lube Civitanova
 2019/2020  Italian Cup, with Cucine Lube Civitanova
 2020/2021  Italian Cup, with Cucine Lube Civitanova

Individual awards
 2022: Coach of the Year (according to La Gazzetta dello Sport)

References

External links
 
 
 
 
 Coach profile at LegaVolley.it  
 Coach/Player profile at Volleybox.net

 

1961 births
Living people
Sportspeople from the Province of Lecce
Italian men's volleyball players
Italian volleyball coaches
Volleyball coaches of international teams
Olympic volleyball players of Italy
Volleyball players at the 1988 Summer Olympics
Goodwill Games medalists in volleyball
Competitors at the 1990 Goodwill Games
Italian expatriate sportspeople in Russia
Italian expatriate sportspeople in Poland
ZAKSA Kędzierzyn-Koźle coaches
Jastrzębski Węgiel coaches
Setters (volleyball)